Nesiosphaerion charynae is a species of beetle in the family Cerambycidae. It was described by Lingafelter in 2008.

References

Elaphidiini
Beetles described in 2008